The 1903 North Dakota Flickertails football team was an American football team that represented the University of North Dakota during the 1903 college football season. The team compiled a 7–0 record and outscored opponents by a total of 274 to 11.

The team was led by first-year head coach Rex B. Kennedy. Victor Wardrope was the team captain for the second of three consecutive years.

Schedule

References

North Dakota
North Dakota Fighting Hawks football seasons
College football undefeated seasons
North Dakota Flickertails football